Vitali Yuryevich Butikov (born 19 June 1987) is a Russian former competitive ice dancer. With partner Kristina Gorshkova, he is the 2008 World Junior bronze medalist.

Butikov switched from singles to ice dancing at age eleven. After their coach, Tatiana Kuzmina, was killed in a car accident in July 2007, Gorshkova and Butikov began working with Elena Tchaikovskaia, Ksenia Rumiantseva, and Petr Durnev.

Programs 
(with Gorshkova)

Competitive highlights
(with Gorshkova)

References

External links

 

Russian male ice dancers
1987 births
Living people
Sportspeople from Perm, Russia
World Junior Figure Skating Championships medalists
Universiade medalists in figure skating
Universiade gold medalists for Russia
Competitors at the 2009 Winter Universiade
Competitors at the 2011 Winter Universiade